Abacetus indrapoerae is a species of ground beetle in the subfamily Pterostichinae. It was described by Tschitscherine in 1903.

References

indrapoerae
Beetles described in 1903